Elections to the Labour Party's Shadow Cabinet (more formally, its "Parliamentary Committee") occurred in July 1970, following the party's defeat in the 1970 general election.

In addition to the 12 members elected, the Leader (Harold Wilson), Deputy Leader (Roy Jenkins), Labour Chief Whip (Bob Mellish), Labour Leader in the House of Lords (Baron Shackleton), and Labour Chief Whip in the Lords (Baron Beswick) were automatically members.  The Labour Lords elected one further member, Baron Champion.

The Chair of the Labour Party was elected at the same time as the Shadow Cabinet, and was given a further automatic place in the cabinet.  The post was won by Douglas Houghton, who also won one of the twelve places in the Shadow Cabinet election.  Ross, who had taken thirteenth place in the Shadow Cabinet election, was given the spare position.

The 12 winners of the election are listed below:

References

1970
Labour Party Shadow Cabinet election
Labour Party (UK) Shadow Cabinet election